Il mondo è meraviglioso is an Italian television film.

See also
 List of Italian television series

External links
 

Italian television series
2005 Italian television series debuts
2000s Italian television series